Vestnes (sometimes called Helland) is the administrative centre of Vestnes Municipality in Møre og Romsdal county, Norway.  The village is located on the western shore of the Tresfjorden, near where the fjord empties into the main Romsdalsfjord.  The village lies along the European route E39 highway.

The Tresfjord Bridge was completed in 2015, connecting Vikebukt to the southern part of Vestnes by bridge rather than an estimated 30-minute drive all the way around the fjord. The Tresfjord Bridge is part of European route E136. The current prime minister, Erna Solberg was there at the opening as a stand-in for Minister of Transport Ketil Solvik-Olsen.

The village of Vestnes is actually located on two peninsulas separated by the Flatevågen bay.

The village has a shopping center, some industries, municipal services, and Vestnes Church.  Vestnesavisa is the local municipal newspaper, based in Vestnes.

References

Villages in Møre og Romsdal
Vestnes